The Russell Falls, a tieredcascade waterfall on the Russell Falls Creek, is located in the Central Highlands region of Tasmania, Australia.

Location and features
Accessible by a paved walking track, the falls are a popular tourist attraction. The waterfall descends over horizontal marine Permian siltstone benches, while the vertical faces of the falls are composed of resistant sandstone layers.

They were first named the Brownings Falls after the original discoverer, circa 1856, but were known as the Russell Falls after 1884, by which time they were already a popular tourist attraction. The Falls Reserve was established in 1885 and in 1899 the Russell Falls were selected as one of eight images to be used on a set of pictorial postage stamps, aimed at promoting the then colony's growing tourist industry.

Gallery

See also

 List of waterfalls of Tasmania

References

External links
 
 

Waterfalls of Tasmania
Central Highlands (Tasmania)
Cascade waterfalls
Tiered waterfalls